Rahul Kukreti (August 2, 1976 – August 12, 2019) was an American cricketer. He played in three matches for the United States cricket team in the 2008 ICC World Cricket League Division Five tournament in Jersey. Kukreti died from a rare form of cancer, undifferentiated chondrosarcoma.

References

External links
 

1976 births
2019 deaths
American cricketers
Indian cricketers
Indian emigrants to the United States
Deaths from bone cancer
Deaths from cancer in Texas
Cricketers from Chandigarh